This is a compilation of Australian films in the genre covering sports activities. Films may cover issues in sport as World Series Cricket, 1968 Olympics Black Power salute, personalities Dawn Fraser and Phar Lap, sporting events and tours and satire. Films provide an insight into the importance of sport into Australian society. Films include fictional and non-fictional stories.

References

Further reading
 Headon, David. Significant Silents: Sporting Australia on Film, 1896–1930. Journal of Popular Culture, Vol. 33 No. 1 Summer 1999 p. 115-128.
 Miller, Toby. The Dawn of an Imagined Community: Australian Sport on Film, Sporting Traditions, Vol. 7 No. 1  Nov 1990 p. 48-59.

Films
Sports